Todd Edward Zeile (born September 9, 1965) is an American former professional baseball third baseman, catcher, and first baseman in Major League Baseball (MLB). He played sixteen seasons, from 1989 to 2004, for the St. Louis Cardinals, Chicago Cubs, Philadelphia Phillies, Baltimore Orioles, Los Angeles Dodgers, Florida Marlins, Texas Rangers, New York Mets, Colorado Rockies, New York Yankees, and Montreal Expos. Zeile graduated from UCLA, where he played collegiate baseball primarily as a catcher. Only five players in MLB history have played for more teams.  Todd currently serves as a pre game and post game reporter for the New York Mets on SportsNet New York.

Playing career

Early career
Zeile broke into the majors in 1989 as a catcher and the Cardinals' most anticipated prospect of the year. Cardinals manager Joe Torre wanted to make room for catcher Tom Pagnozzi and believed Zeile would be a more productive hitter and would have a longer career if he moved from behind the plate, so Zeile moved, with some reluctance, initially to first base and then to third base in 1990.

Middle career

Zeile spent most of the 1990s as a third baseman. He  batted .268 with 20 home runs and 80 RBI in 134 games with the Phillies in 1996 until he was acquired along with Pete Incaviglia by the Orioles on August 29 of that year in a transaction that was completed when Calvin Maduro and Garrett Stephenson were sent to Philadelphia on September 3 and 4 respectively. He was traded from the Los Angeles Dodgers to the Florida Marlins along with Mike Piazza in 1998 for five players, then was traded to the Rangers later that season. In 1999, Zeile was part of a historic Rangers team. Along with Gregg Zaun and Jeff Zimmerman, he was one of three players on the team whose last names began with "Z". Not since the 1916 Chicago Cubs, with Heinie Zimmerman, Dutch Zwilling, and Rollie Zeider, had this occurred.

In 2000, he then signed a contract with the New York Mets, where he rejoined Piazza, and moved to first base for the Mets in 2000, who wanted him to replace John Olerud. In 2002, he was traded to the Rockies, where he moved back to third base. He led all National League third basemen in errors in 2002, with 21, when he had the lowest fielding percentage in the league (.942).

End of career
After one season with Colorado, Zeile became a free agent again and signed with the Yankees in 2003. He was released mid-August and was signed by Montreal three days later. Having decided 2004 would be his last season, Zeile returned to the New York Mets. He also voiced displeasure with the Yankees, saying that he has "no desire to play again for that organization", and that "I think some of the things that happen over there are different than any other organization in baseball. I have a pretty good track record to judge that."

Zeile retired following the 2004 season. Having planned his retirement in advance (and with the Mets well out of the playoff race), Mets manager Art Howe let Zeile once again start as a catcher, his original position, on September 18, 2004. It was Zeile's first appearance there in 14 years. It was the second-longest span ever between appearances at the position. Gabby Street caught a game in 1931 after last having caught in 1912. Zeile's span is now the third longest, since Craig Biggio started the final game of his career at catcher after a 16-year span.

Zeile got one final start as a catcher two weeks later on October 3, 2004 in the season's final game, as the Mets' regular catcher, Jason Phillips's foot hurt him and he could not play. In the 6th inning, in his final at-bat as a major leaguer, Zeile hit a three-run home run to left-field off Montreal Expos pitcher Claudio Vargas. In the 8th inning, in his final play as a major leaguer, Ryan Church popped up to him, as a catcher, in foul territory. It was also John Franco's last out made as a Met pitcher. The Mets won the game, 8-1. Both games Zeile caught in his final season were started by Tom Glavine.

He also pitched an inning with the Mets when they didn't have any pitchers left, as he gave up 5 runs in the 8th inning in the Mets' 19-10 loss to Montreal on July 26, 2004. It was his second appearance as a pitcher, having also appeared in a game for the Rockies in 2002.

On October 3, 2004, he became one of 53 players (as of ) ever to hit a home run in his final at bat. Zeile's final home run also made him the last person ever to hit a home run off a Montreal Expos pitcher. Following that game, which was the last of the season, the Expos moved to Washington, D.C. and became the Washington Nationals.

Zeile ended his career having hit at least one home run for each of the 11 teams he played for over the course of his career, distinguishing him as the only player in major league history to have hit a home run for over 10 teams.

Film work
Since retiring from Major League Baseball, Zeile has pursued two other passions: film production, and acting. He founded Green Diamond Entertainment, a film production company in West Hollywood, California, during his second stint with the Mets. He appeared in the following:

Saturday Night Live (television series, 1997)
Dirty Deeds (movie, 2005—produced by Green Diamond Entertainment)
The King of Queens (television series, 2005–2006, two episodes)
Liquid: Live at Five (video, 2007)
Liquid: Money Talks (video, 2008)
Liquid: The Ten, Volume One (video, 2008)
I Am (movie, 2010)

He was also executive producer of Dirty Deeds and a producer of I Am.

Personal life
Zeile attended William S. Hart High School in Santa Clarita, California, where he was an outstanding student-athlete.

Zeile is a direct descendant of Presidents John Quincy Adams and John Adams.

Zeile was married to Olympic champion Julianne McNamara, the first American gymnast to earn a perfect 10.0 at the Olympics. They have four children, including son Garrett (b. November 27, 1993), and daughter Hannah (b. November 7, 1997), who has Type 1 diabetes. As a result, Zeile and McNamara have been particularly active in juvenile diabetes research charities. They divorced in January 2015. Their daughter, Hannah, appears on the TV series This Is Us as teenager Kate Pearson.

On June 27, 2020, Zeile married Kristin Gamboa, daughter of ex-major league coach and minor league manager Tom Gamboa.

Zeile's nephew, Shane Zeile, was drafted by the Detroit Tigers in the fifth-round of the 2014 Major League Baseball draft.

See also
 List of Major League Baseball career home run leaders
 List of Major League Baseball career hits leaders
 List of Major League Baseball career runs batted in leaders

References

External links

Todd Zeile at SABR (Baseball BioProject)
Todd Zeile at Ultimate Mets Database

centerfield maz: Former Met of the Day: Todd Zeile (2000–2001)

1965 births
Living people
American expatriate baseball players in Canada
Arkansas Travelers players
Baltimore Orioles players
Baseball players from Los Angeles
Chicago Cubs players
Colorado Rockies players
Erie Cardinals players
Florida Marlins players
Los Angeles Dodgers players
Louisville Redbirds players
Major League Baseball third basemen
Montreal Expos players
New York Mets players
New York Yankees players
Philadelphia Phillies players
Sportspeople from Santa Clarita, California
Springfield Cardinals players
St. Louis Cardinals players
Texas Rangers players
UCLA Bruins baseball players
Peninsula Oilers players